The 1922 New York Giants season was the franchise's 40th season. The team finished in first place in the National League with a 93–61 record.  The Giants won their second consecutive World Series, defeating the New York Yankees in five games (Game 2 was a 3–3 tie) without a loss.

Regular season

Season standings

Record vs. opponents

Opening Day lineup

Roster

Player stats

Batting

Starters by position
Note: Pos = Position; G = Games played; AB = At bats; H = Hits; Avg. = Batting average; HR = Home runs; RBI = Runs batted in

Other batters
Note: G = Games played; AB = At bats; H = Hits; Avg. = Batting average; HR = Home runs; RBI = Runs batted in

Pitching

Starting pitchers
Note: G = Games pitched; IP = Innings pitched; W = Wins; L = Losses; ERA = Earned run average; SO = Strikeouts

Other pitchers
Note: G = Games pitched; IP = Innings pitched; W = Wins; L = Losses; ERA = Earned run average; SO = Strikeouts

Relief pitchers
Note: G = Games pitched; W = Wins; L = Losses; SV = Saves; ERA = Earned run average; SO = Strikeouts

1922 World Series

Game 1
October 4, 1922, at the Polo Grounds in New York City

Game 2
October 5, 1922, at the Polo Grounds in New York City

Game 3
October 6, 1922, at the Polo Grounds in New York City

Game 4
October 7, 1922, at the Polo Grounds in New York City

Game 5
October 8, 1922, at the Polo Grounds in New York City

References
 1922 New York Giants team page at Baseball Reference
 1922 New York Giants team page at Baseball Almanac

New York Giants (NL)
San Francisco Giants seasons
New York Giants season
National League champion seasons
World Series champion seasons
New York G
1920s in Manhattan
Washington Heights, Manhattan